Shaunae Miller-Uibo (born 15 April 1994) is a Bahamian track and field sprinter who competes in the 200 and 400 metres. She is a two-time Olympic champion after winning the women's 400 metres at the 2016 Rio Olympics and again at the 2020 Tokyo Olympics.

At the World Athletics Championships, Miller-Uibo won silver medals in the 400 m in 2015 and 2019, and a bronze at the 200 m in 2017 when she also placed fourth at her longer distance. In 2022, she won her first world outdoor and indoor 400 m titles. She holds North American records in the 400 m both outdoors and indoors, set in October 2019 and February 2021, respectively. Her marks of 48.36 (improved at the Tokyo Games) and 50.21 seconds place her respectively sixth and joint eighth on the world all-time list. She holds world bests over the 300 metres outdoors and indoors.

At 16 years old, she was the 400 m 2010 World junior champion to take the World youth title a year later. At 19, Miller-Uibo placed fourth in the 200 m at the 2013 World Championships, and then took her first senior medal (a bronze) at the 2014 World Indoor Championships competing at 400 m. She was the 2018 Commonwealth Games 200 m champion and won four Diamond League titles, having secured the 200 m/400 m double in 2017; she owns circuit records in both disciplines.

Miller-Uibo holds the world's fastest women's marks in straight races of 150 m and 200 m. Her personal best of 21.74 s for the 200 m is a Bahamian national record. She won several national titles in both her disciplines and the NCAA Division I indoor title for the Georgia Bulldogs and Lady Bulldogs.

Early life
Of Afro-Bahamian heritage, Miller-Uibo was born in a Christian home to Mabelene and Shaun Miller in Nassau, Bahamas, the granddaughter and niece of pastors, on 15 April 1994. She has a personal faith and trust in God. Her sister is Shauntae-Ashleigh Miller, Miss Universe Bahamas 2020.

She completed her high school education at St. Augustine's College in Nassau and later attended the University of Georgia.

Career

Youth career
Miller-Uibo competed in athletics from a very young age and won five medals at the 2007 Central American and Caribbean Age Group Championships in Athletics in the under-14 category. Bronze medals in relay races followed at the 2009 CARIFTA Games and the 2009 Pan American Junior Athletics Championships.

She claimed the 400 m titles at the 2010 Central American and Caribbean Junior Championships and 2010 CARIFTA Games, as well as four medals with the Bahamas in the 4 × 100 metres relay and 4 × 400 metres relay. Sixteen-year-old Miller-Uibo became the first Bahamian to be 400 m champion at the 2010 World Junior Championships in Athletics and the youngest woman to ever win the event. She won the gold medal in a time of 52.52, denying Margaret Etim, who finished second in 53.05 (this was the slowest winning time in the history of the event).

In the following year, Miller-Uibo won the 2011 World Youth Championships in Athletics with a time of 51.84, becoming the first athlete ever to hold both the U20 and U18 championship 400 m titles concurrently. She returned to defend her 400 m title at the 2011 CARIFTA Games, but was disqualified in the final. She also failed in her defence at the 2012 World Junior Championships in Athletics, trailing in fourth. However, she won 200 m and 4 × 400 metres relay silver medals at the 2012 CARIFTA Games. In her last age category competition, she won three gold medals (200 m, 400 m, 4 × 100 metres relay) at the 2013 CARIFTA Games and was given the Austin Sealy Award as the best athlete of the tournament.

Senior career
At the 2012 London Olympics, Miller-Uibo did not finish her 400 m heat. She turned professional in 2013, signing a sponsorship deal with Adidas. She made her first global final that same year, taking fourth in the 200 m at the 2013 World Championships in Athletics. The year after, Miller-Uibo won her first senior medal, finishing behind Francena McCorory and Kaliese Spencer in the 400 m at the 2014 IAAF World Indoor Championships. She made the 200 m final at the 2014 Commonwealth Games but ended the race in sixth.

The 2015 season marked her first impact at the IAAF Diamond League, as she won the 400 m at the top level Athletissima and Memorial Van Damme meets. Miller-Uibo won the silver medal in the 400 m at the 2015 World Championships that year. She also ran with the Bahamian women's 4 × 400 m relay team in the heats at that competition and set a Bahamian national record of 3:28.46 minutes.

In 2016, Miller-Uibo won the Prefontaine Classic 400 m race.

At the 2017 Prefontaine Classic, Miller-Uibo became the first Bahamian woman to run under 22 seconds in the 200 m, improving her own national record to 21.91 seconds. On 4 June 2017, she set the 200 metres straight world record of 21.76 s, greatly improving the previous record of 22.55 s set by Allyson Felix. At the 2017 World Championships in London, she won the bronze medal in the 200 m event. She finished fourth in the 400 m final. In the same year, Miller-Uibo became the first Bahamian ever to win a Diamond League title as she claimed both the 200 m and 400 m titles.

Having dominated the 200 m during 2018 and 2019 and clocking a world-leading time in the 400 m in 2018, Miller-Uibo won the 400 m silver medal at the 2019 World Championships in Athletics in Qatar, running the tenth fastest time in history, a national record of 48.37 seconds. The winner of the event, Salwa Eid Naser, was provisionally suspended by the Athletics Integrity Unit in June 2020 for missing four anti-doping tests in 12 months, the last of which was in January 2020.

On 13 February 2021, Miller-Uibo broke a NACAC record in the indoor 400 m with a time of 50.21 seconds, set at the New Balance Indoor Grand Prix in New York. On 4 April, she opened her outdoor season with a world-leading time of 22.03 s, her fastest ever 200 m opener, set at the Pure Athletics Spring Invitational in Clermont, Florida.

In March 2022, she claimed her first global title as a senior, winning the women's 400 m event at the World Indoor Championships in Belgrade with a time of 50.31 s, after her bronze indoor debut in 2014. Later that year in July, Miller-Uibo went on to secure her first senior world outdoor title at the World Championships Eugene 2022 in a time of 49.11 s, winning by nearly half a second in leading a Caribbean sweep. Afterward, she revealed that she is looking forward to changing her main discipline to the 200 metres and possibly heptathlon.

Olympic champion
At the 2016 Rio Olympics, she won the gold medal in the 400 m, diving across the line to beat Allyson Felix by 0.07 seconds and record a personal best time of 49.44 seconds. She was the flag-bearer for the Bahamas at the 2016 Summer Olympics. Miller-Uibo went on to win the gold medal again in the 400 m at the 2020 Olympics, held in Tokyo in 2021.

Personal life
Miller met Maicel Uibo, an Estonian decathlete who won silver at the 2019 World Championships, in Georgia and the pair married in 2017. On 4 February 2023, she announced on Instagram that she is pregnant with her first child.

Achievements

Personal bests

International competitions

Circuit wins and titles
 Diamond League champion:   2017 (200 m & 400 m),  2018 (200 m),  2019 (200 m)
 400 metres wins, other events specified in parenthesis
 2015 (2): Lausanne, Brussels
 2016 (3): Shanghai, Eugene, London
 2017 (4): Shanghai, Rabat, Zürich (200 m), Brussels (WL )
 2018 (6): Shanghai (200 m, MR SB), Eugene, Rabat (200 m, MR), Monaco (WL  NR}, Birmingham (200 m, MR), Brussels (200 m)
 2019 (3): Monaco (200 m, SB), Birmingham (200 m), Zürich (200 m, WL DLR NR)
 2021 (1): Monaco (200 m)
 2022 (2): Paris, Monaco

National titles
 Bahamian National Championships
 200 m: 2017,2021
 400 m: 2010, 2014, 2015, 2016, 2019, 2021
 High jump: 2018

See also
List of 2016 Summer Olympics medal winners
List of Olympic medalists in athletics (women)
List of World Championships in Athletics medalists (women)
List of professional sports families
List of Bahamians
200 metres at the World Championships in Athletics
400 metres at the Olympics
Bahamas at the Olympics

References

External links

1994 births
Living people
Sportspeople from Nassau, Bahamas
Bahamian Christians
Bahamian female sprinters
Olympic female sprinters
Olympic athletes of the Bahamas
Olympic gold medalists for the Bahamas
Olympic gold medalists in athletics (track and field)
Athletes (track and field) at the 2012 Summer Olympics
Athletes (track and field) at the 2016 Summer Olympics
Medalists at the 2016 Summer Olympics
Commonwealth Games gold medallists for the Bahamas
Commonwealth Games medallists in athletics
Athletes (track and field) at the 2014 Commonwealth Games
Athletes (track and field) at the 2018 Commonwealth Games
World Athletics Championships athletes for the Bahamas
World Athletics Championships medalists
Georgia Lady Bulldogs track and field athletes
Diamond League winners
IAAF Continental Cup winners
Commonwealth Games gold medallists in athletics
Athletes (track and field) at the 2020 Summer Olympics
Medalists at the 2020 Summer Olympics
World Athletics U20 Championships winners
World Athletics Indoor Championships winners
Medallists at the 2018 Commonwealth Games